Raaba, also known as Raaba bei Graz, was a village, merged into Raaba-Grambach in 2015, in the province of the Austrian state of Styria and a suburb of Graz.

Due to its proximity to Graz an area with medium-rise office blocks has developed on the edge of Raaba.

Population

References

Cities and towns in Graz-Umgebung District